Marin Mustață (3 March 1954 – 2007) was a Romanian sabre fencer. He competed at the 1976, 1980 and 1984 Olympics and won team bronze medals in 1976 and 1984. After retiring from competition he worked as a fencing coach with Tractorul Brasov and the Romanian national team. He teamed with his cousin Cornel Marin who is also a sabre fencer.

In 2007, he died of lung cancer.

References

1954 births
2007 deaths
Romanian male fencers
Romanian sabre fencers
Olympic fencers of Romania
Fencers at the 1976 Summer Olympics
Fencers at the 1980 Summer Olympics
Fencers at the 1984 Summer Olympics
Olympic bronze medalists for Romania
Olympic medalists in fencing
Sportspeople from Bucharest
Medalists at the 1976 Summer Olympics
Medalists at the 1984 Summer Olympics
Romanian fencing coaches
Universiade medalists in fencing
Universiade bronze medalists for Romania